The Kokushkin Bridge is a bridge across the Griboedov Canal in Saint Petersburg, Russia.

History 
The bridge got its name from the merchant Vasily Kokushkin, whose house was located at the corner of Kokushkin Alley and Garden Street. From 1786 to 1796, the name was spelled Kokushkinov Bridge and from 1801 to 1853 the bridge was mistakenly called Kukushkin Bridge (meaning Cuckoo Bridge in Russian).  Until 1872, the official name of the bridge could be written both as Kokushkin and as Kakushkin.

The first wooden bridge at that location was built in 1790. It underwent major restoration in 1872, when, the span of the bridge was replaced with an exact replica, so the bridge preserved the same appearance.

In 1946, the bridge was replaced with a new one, by engineer B.B.Levin and architect L.A.Noskov. The old supports were completely dismantled, and the new ones were set in their place. The wooden span was replaced with a steel one consisting of eight welded beams.

New cast iron railings were installed on the bridge. The abutments of the railings resemble these on the canal's embankment.

The bridge in literature 
While the bridge is not the most famous or picturesque, it is connected with some of the most prominent authors in Russian literature.

In 1829, Alexander Pushkin mentioned Kokushkin bridge in a famous epigram. For the first edition of Eugene Onegin, the poet commissioned an illustration depicting himself and Onegin walking together along the quay. Upon receiving the illustration, which represented him leaning on a parapet with his back turned towards the Peter and Paul Fortress, he was exceedingly displeased with the result (which had little in common with his own preliminary sketch, illustrated to the right) and scribbled the following epigram underneath:

Fyodor Dostoevsky's Crime and Punishment starts with a mention of the bridge:

K. bridge here means Kokushkin bridge.

In Mikhail Lermontov's unfinished novel Shtoss, the main character, the artist Lugin, looks for Shtoss House near Kokushkin Bridge. 
It is conceivable that Lermontov took the actual Zverkov House as the prototype of Shtoss House. Zverkov House was a famous apartment house near Kokushkin Bridge.

In 1829, the then young and unknown Nikolai Gogol rented a room in that house, where he wrote Evenings on a Farm Near Dikanka, as commemorated by a plaque on the house. Gogol liked to place the characters in his writings in real locations that he had visited. In "Diary of a Madman", Gogol sends Poprishchin over the Kokushkin Bridge to the Zverkov House.

References 

Bridges in Saint Petersburg
Bridges completed in 1790
Bridges completed in 1946
1790 establishments in the Russian Empire
Bridges completed in 1872